The 2003 British Rally Championship season was the 45th season of the British Rally Championship.  The season consisted of seven rounds — the Rally of Wales, scheduled for 22–23 March, was cancelled — and began on 25 April, with the Pirelli International Rally in the north east of England.  The season ended on 26 October, at the Tempest South of England Rally.  The series was organised by the Royal Scottish Automobile Club.

The title was won by Englishman Jonny Milner and Welsh co-driver Nicky Beech, driving a Toyota Corolla WRC.

Entry list

Calendar
 Pirelli International Rally – 25–26 April
 RSAC Scottish Rally – 13–15 June
 Jim Clark Memorial Rally – 5–6 July
 Manx International Rally – 31 July–2 August
 The AnswerCall Direct International Ulster Rally – 5–6 September
 Trackrod Rally Yorkshire – 27–28 September
 Tempest South of England Rally – 25–26 October

References

British Rally Championship seasons
Rally Championship
British Rally Championship